The Bricker Building is a historic building in East Hollywood, Los Angeles, California, U.S.. It was built in 1924. It has been listed on the National Register of Historic Places since January 7, 2011.

References

East Hollywood, Los Angeles
Buildings and structures on the National Register of Historic Places in Los Angeles
Buildings and structures completed in 1924